Patrick Riordan may refer to:
Patrick William Riordan (1841–1914), American Roman Catholic priest; second Archbishop of San Francisco
Pat Riordan (born 1979), Canadian rugby union player